If I Were Brittania I'd Waive the Rules is Budgie's sixth album, released in April 1976. 

The album is the band's first new release with A&M Records, having signed with them in late 1975 to distribute the US pressings of Bandolier. Musically, the band's usual hard rock style is augmented on this album with funk elements in two songs, and progressive rock in two others.

The title is a pun on the concept of Britannia ruling the waves. Professor Irene Morra of Cardiff University wrote that Budgie used this title to "declare an essential lack of agency within Britain" which helped portray a countercultural identity, lacking in national ambition.

Track listing

Personnel 
Budgie
Burke Shelley – bass, lead vocals
Tony Bourge – guitar, backing vocals; lead vocals (track 6) 
Steve Williams – drums
Guest musicians
Richard Dunn – keyboards
Production
Pat Moran – mix engineer
Fabio Nicoli – art director
Alun Hood – illustrator
Gered Mankowitz – photography

References 

1976 albums
A&M Records albums
Budgie (band) albums